Hidaiyah "Yaya" Bey is an American rhythm and blues musician from Brooklyn.

History
Bey released her first album in 2020 titled Madison Tapes. Bey released an EP titled The Things I Can't Take With Me the following year, through Big Dada. Bey released her second full-length album on June 16, 2022. The album received "Best New Music" from Pitchfork upon release.

Personal life
Bey is the daughter of hip hop artist, Grand Daddy I.U..

Discography

Studio albums
Madison Tapes (2020)
Remember Your North Star (2022, Big Dada)

EPs
The Things I Can't Take with Me (2021, Big Dada)

References

Living people
American rhythm and blues musicians
Singers from New York City
Year of birth missing (living people)